Heather Lynn Mac Donald (born November 23, 1956) is an American conservative political commentator, essayist, attorney, and author.  She is known for her pro-police views and her opposition to criminal justice reform, as expressed in her book The War on Cops and columns such as "The Myth of the Racist Cop" and "The Myth of Systemic Police Racism."

Early life
Heather Mac Donald grew up in Los Angeles, California. Her family name was MacDonald; she later added the space to her surname, although she has said it was a "bad idea". In 1978, she graduated from Yale University with a BA summa cum laude in English. After receiving a Mellon Fellowship from Yale, she attended Clare College, Cambridge, earning an MA in English. While at Cambridge she also studied in Italy through a Cambridge study grant. In 1985, she graduated with a Juris Doctor degree from Stanford University Law School. 

After graduating from Stanford, Mac Donald clerked for Judge Stephen Reinhardt of the United States Court of Appeals for the Ninth Circuit, and was subsequently an attorney-advisor in the Office of the General Counsel of the U.S. Environmental Protection Agency and a volunteer with the Natural Resources Defense Council.

Employment
She is a Thomas W. Smith Fellow of the Manhattan Institute and a contributing editor of the institute's City Journal.

Positions
Mac Donald refers to herself as a secular conservative. She has argued that conservatism is superior to liberalism by virtue of the ideas alone, and that religion should not affect the argument and is unnecessary for conservatism. Mac Donald maintains that conservative values like small government, self-reliance and liberty can be defended without "recourse to invisible deities or the religions that exalt them."

She has testified on criminal justice and the deincarceration movement before the US Senate Judiciary Committee, has testified before the Subcommittee on Civil and Constitutional Rights of the US House Committee on the Judiciary, and has advocated positions on numerous subjects including victimization, philanthropy, immigration reform, crime prevention, racism, racial profiling, black incarceration, rape, effect of two parents on crime, politics, welfare, and matters pertaining to cities and academia.

Mac Donald has criticized welfare and philanthropic institutions such as the Ford Foundation and the Carnegie Corporation for suggesting that welfare is a right; in particular, she has criticized welfare because "generations have grown up fatherless and dependent". She has written that welfare programs serve as a "dysfunction enabler" and that food stamps cause an "unhealthy dependence". According to Mac Donald, under American immigration policies, the United States has been "importing another underclass", one with the "potential to expand indefinitely."

In a 2019 op-ed titled, "Trump Isn’t the One Dividing Us by Race", she argued that Democrats and the media are at fault for racial divisions in the United States. She argued that it is those on the left who have emboldened white supremacists. She argued that Donald Trump is not racially divisive because he "rarely uses racial categories in his speech or his tweets."

During the COVID-19 pandemic, she criticized March 2020 shelter-in-place policies as "unbridled panic". She argued in March 2020 that COVID-19 would have a similar casualty rate as the flu, despite public health experts saying otherwise.

Policing and national security 
Mac Donald has been described as "pro-police". She rejects that police are systematically racist, calling it a "false narrative." She has called for a return to Terry stop and frisk tactics and "zero-tolerance" policing. She has argued that too much criticism of police brutality has made police fearful of engaging in proactive policing, and that this has caused more crime. She has been a vocal critic of Black Lives Matter. While talking to the conservative radio host Rush Limbaugh, she accused President Barack Obama of "attacking the very foundation of civilization" by giving credibility to Black Lives Matter.

During the 2016 presidential election, she described a speech by Donald Trump on criminal justice as "a radical, bold, and important change of course in the prevailing discourse about policing and crime."

She is an outspoken critic of criminal justice reform, such as the Sentencing Reform and Corrections Act, which she testified against in October 2015. She has spoken out against no-racial-profiling programs for the police, calling them a "politically correct ignoring" of what is known to be the "logical necessity of Islamic terrorisms." She has criticized efforts to instate no-racial-profiling policies, calling these efforts an "illogical tautology" because "you cannot be an Islamic terrorist unless you're a member of the Muslim faith".

She has defended the Patriot Act and argued for secrecy and speed in handling problems as well as the sharing of information between departments within the intelligence community, and advocated that the benefits of government power be balanced against the risks of abuse. She stated that the interrogation techniques promulgated in the war on terror were "light years" from real torture and "hedged around" with bureaucratic safeguards.

In her 2005 testimony to Congress, she claimed that 95% of outstanding homicide warrants in Los Angeles were for undocumented immigrants and that 75% of L.A.'s most wanted list comprised undocumented immigrants. Fact checks by PolitiFact and Snopes found no evidence for those assertions; Mac Donald told PolitiFact in 2020 that the figures were a "rough estimate" given to her by an unnamed member of the Los Angeles Police Department.

In September 2019 congressional testimony, Mac Donald cited a July 2019 PNAS study on the races of police officers and civilians who are shot, which purported to show that there was no racial bias in police shootings. However, the study that she cited has been corrected, and the editors of the journal wrote that the study was unable to support any conclusions about racial bias in police shootings. One of the study's authors, University of Maryland psychology professor David Johnson, told CityLab that he was "not happy" with the way Mac Donald has characterized the study. The authors of the study later called for its retraction, saying that the study continued to be misused, with the authors specifically mentioning editorials by Mac Donald.

Reviews of her books
Writing in The New York Times in 2000, Robin Finn described Mac Donald as an "influential institute thinker who risks being stereotyped as a right-leaning academic curmudgeon". Columnist George F. Will wrote a blurb for Mac Donald's book The Burden of Bad Ideas (2000) that praised her thinking about urban problems. In The New York Times, Allen D. Boyer wrote a positive brief review of The Burden of Bad Ideas, concluding that "among discussions of urban malaise, where so much hot air has been recycled, this book has the freshness of a stiff, changing breeze".

Tim Lynch, director of the Cato Institute's project on criminal justice, gave her 2016 book The War on Cops a negative review in Reason magazine, concluding, "What Mac Donald calls a 'war on cops' is better described as a much-needed debate about crime, law enforcement tactics, and how to deal with systemic police misconduct," and adding, "Conservatives have some worthwhile ideas to offer in this debate, but Mac Donald's polemics add heat, not light."

Steven Pinker, Charles Murray and Shelby Steele were featured in blurbs for Mac Donald's 2018 book The Diversity Delusion. Pinker, professor of psychology at Harvard University, wrote that "with her spitfire writing and scorn for nonsense she is forcing universities to live up to their own principles." Murray, an American Enterprise Institute scholar, said the book was "crammed with facts and numbers that universities go to great lengths to hide." Steele, a conservative author, wrote, "Not since Allan Bloom's The Closing of the American Mind has a book so thoroughly exposed the damage done to American institutions—particularly universities—by modern liberalism's glib commitment to diversity."

2017 protest
In spring 2017, a protest group announced plans to "shut down" Mac Donald's speech on the Black Lives Matter movement at a college campus in California, calling her racist, fascist, and anti-black. On April 7, around 250 protesters surrounded audience members and prevented them from entering the building where she was speaking at Claremont McKenna College, whose president, Hiram Chodosh, afterward said, "Based on the judgment of the Claremont Police Department, we jointly concluded that any forced interventions or arrests would have created unsafe conditions for students, faculty, staff, and guests." Mac Donald ultimately gave the talk to a small audience in the Marian Miner Cook Athenaeum that was live-streamed on Claremont McKenna's website. Chodosh claimed that "the effort to silence her voice effectively amplified it to a much larger audience." The college subsequently suspended seven students.

Books

The Illegal-Alien Crime Wave, "City Journal" Winter 2004
The Immigration Solution (co-authored with Victor Davis Hanson and Steven Malanga). Ivan R. Dee. 2006.

  (due for release April 18)

Awards
 Bradley Prize for Outstanding Intellectual Achievement, 2005.
 The Fund for American Studies Kenneth Y. Tomlinson Award for Outstanding Journalism, 2017.
 National Association of Scholars Peter Shaw Award, 2019.

Personal life
Mac Donald is an atheist. She lives in New York City.

References

External links

"Excoriating the Enablers, in 12 Chapters", by Robin Finn, The New York Times, November 28, 2000
Video of conversation between Heather Mac Donald and Glenn Loury at Bloggingheads.tv
Video (and audio) of debate/discussion with Heather Mac Donald and Mark Kleiman on Bloggingheads.tv
The Campus Rape Myth: The reality: bogus statistics, feminist victimology, and university-approved sex toys by Heather Mac Donald in 2008

1956 births
Living people
American atheists
American essayists
American political commentators
American political writers
American women journalists
American women lawyers
Lawyers from New York City
Manhattan Institute for Policy Research
New York (state) Republicans
Phillips Academy alumni
Race and crime in the United States
Stanford Law School alumni
Writers from New York City
Yale University alumni
21st-century American women